Sister's Slam Dunk is a South Korean reality show that aired every Friday on KBS 2TV from April 8 to December 2, 2016. The show's first season featured an all-female cast consisting of Ra Mi-ran, Kim Sook, Hong Jin-kyung, Min Hyo-rin, Jessi and Tiffany, and followed their attempts at fulfilling each cast member's dream using a budget of ₩2,196,000 or approximately $2,000.

The cast members formed a special girl group named "Unnies" and released a Park Jin-young-produced single titled "Shut Up", featuring You Hee-yeol, in July 2016.

Season 2 of the program focused primarily on the girl group project, which was Min Hyo-rin's dream in season 1. The show followed seven members, Kang Ye-won, Han Chae-young, Hong Jin-young, Minzy and Jeon So-mi, with Kim Sook and Hong Jin-kyung returning, as they formed the second generation of "Unnies", produced by Kim Hyeong-seok (Park Jin-young's mentor). The fulfillment of each member's personal dreams have become the side projects of the program. The fan club name for the group remains as "Dongsaengs" (i.e. younger siblings) and their official greeting, as suggested by Heo Kyung-hwan, is "Shoot! Shoot! Shoot!, Hello! We are Unnies!", with an emphasis on the basketball shooting motion while saying "Shoot". Their official fandom object is a denim-colored balloon.

Content
Sister's Slam Dunk follows the "Real Variety Show" format where the content is mostly unscripted. Additionally, there are no signature segments within the show, as it focuses on completing a single major objective over the course of several episodes. In resemblance to a reality show and a documentary show, each episode also documented their activities together and the relationship between the members. In season 1, the overarching theme of the show was the fulfillment of each member's dreams. Every episode focused on accomplishing several tasks that would lead to the fulfillment of those dreams. The members' dreams are, in chronological order:
 Kim Sook – Obtaining a bus driver's license. Episodes for this dream revolves around the members, especially Kim Sook and Jessi, practicing the way to drive a bus with the final task is to participate in a qualification exam to obtain the license.
 Min Hyo-rin – Debuting in a girl group. Episodes for this dream revolves around the members practicing singing and dancing techniques to debut as idol singers. The members created a girl group, called "Unnies", and a song was produced for the members by Park Jin-young of JYP Entertainment with the final task is to perform at the KBS Music Bank.
 Jessi – Completing three missions from the past, present, and future from Jessi's father. Episodes for this dream revolves around the members accommodating to the requests of Jessi's parents with the final task is to create a fake wedding for Jessi.
 Hong Jin-kyung – Producing a Hong Jinkyung Show. Episodes for this dream revolves around the members filming the short film Was Will with the final task is to submit the short film to a film festival.
 Ra Mi-ran – Building/remodeling a house, having a photoshoot, camping, and producing a Christmas carol. Episodes for this dream revolves around the members planning and working to build a restaurant after finding an abandoned building. Additionally, similar to Min Hyo-rin's dream, the members practice their singing techniques in preparation for the carol recording.

In season 2, the format remains as "Real Variety Show" without a scripted segment and follows the members' activities across a certain period of time. However, the theme of the show focused on the continuation of the girl group project, "Unnies". The content for each episode chronicles the members' progress towards releasing songs and training for their stage performance. Similar to season 1, each episode documented their activities for a couple of days and their bonding as group members.

Cast

Season 1
 Ra Mi-ran, actress born 1975
 Kim Sook, comedian born 1975
 Hong Jin-kyung, model and host born 1977
 Min Hyo-rin, actress born 1986
 Jessi, singer born 1988
 Tiffany, singer born 1989 (withdrew in August 2016 due to controversy)

Season 2
 Kim Sook, comedian born 1975
 Hong Jin-kyung, model and host born 1977
 Kang Ye-won, actress born 1980
 Han Chae-young, actress born 1980
 Hong Jin-young, singer born 1985
 Minzy, singer born 1994
 Jeon So-mi, singer born 2001

Timeline

Episodes

Season 1

Season 2

Ratings

In the table below, the blue number represents the lowest ratings and the red number represents the highest ratings.

Season 1

Season 2

Discography

Videography

Music videos

Controversy
On August 14, 2016, (the day before Korean Liberation Day), Tiffany posted photos on Instagram and, a day later, onto Snapchat that included the current Japanese flag and the Rising Sun design which was part of a Snapchat geo-filter respectively while performing in Tokyo as a part of SM Town Live World Tour V. Although she had taken down her Snapchat post within minutes after posting, she faced substantial criticism, and she deleted the Instagram images soon after as well. The program received an outpouring of complaints demanding for the show to remove Tiffany. On August 18, 2016, the program announced that after discussing the situation with S.M. Entertainment, the decision to withdraw was reached. The official statement reads: "As a result of the discussion, we have the final decision for Tiffany to leave the show, in consideration of what we agree to be the effect that the controversy had on the country's sentiments." However, in December 2016, Tiffany reunited with the other cast members at the 15th KBS Entertainment Awards, where they opened the ceremony by performing "Shut Up".

Awards and nominations

References

External links
 

Korean Broadcasting System original programming
South Korean variety television shows
2016 South Korean television series debuts
2017 South Korean television series endings